Alexander Adie (1861 – 18 July 1940) was a pioneer of the sugar industry in Childers, Queensland where he was born, and the third chairman of the Isis Central Sugar Mill Company.  From 1897 till 1939 Adie kept a work diary or farm production record.  Fifteen of his diaries have survived, being rescued as they were on their way to the local tip.  They provide a record of farm life in the late 19th century and in particular, the recruitment and employment of South Sea Islanders known then as Kanakas.  Adie used his diaries to keep a tally of work done by his Kanakas or contract gangs in order to know how much pay was needed for each person.

References 

19th-century Australian businesspeople
20th-century Australian businesspeople
1861 births
1940 deaths
People from Wide Bay–Burnett